Connoisseur Media LLC is an American media company. It is based in Westport, Connecticut and led by Jeff Warshaw. Connoisseur operates radio stations and digital assets in markets across the U.S. cities of Billings, Frederick, Maryland; Bay Shore, Hempstead, Smithtown, Patchogue, New York; and Bridgeport, New Haven, Southport and Westport, Connecticut.

History 
Founder and CEO, Jeff Warshaw built his first station while still a student at the Wharton School of Business at the University of Pennsylvania. In 1993, Warshaw founded Connoisseur Communications Partners LP, which he later sold to Cumulus Broadcasting in 2000 for $258 million.  In 2004, he and CFO Mike Driscoll formed Connoisseur Media which operates 13 radio stations and various digital markets. The first company's acquisition involved several stations in Bloomington, Illinois with capital from hedge fund Farallon Capital, along with its founders. Through a combination of start-ups, move-ins, and acquisitions, Connoisseur Media expanded. It maintains a significant presence in the New York City media market.

It was announced in July 2015 that Petrus Holding Company LP had invested in Connoisseur Media.

On March 27, 2019, Connoisseur Media announced that it would acquire WFRE and sister station WFMD from the Aloha Station Trust in exchange for transferring its Erie, Pennsylvania cluster to iHeartMedia. The sale closed on May 21, 2019.

On April 14, 2022, Connoisseur Media made an offer to purchase the assets of Atlanta, GA based Cumulus Media (Symbol: CMLS) including its debt.  Cumulus has a national footprint as well as the owners of Westwood One, a satellite driven company which provides programming to non-affiliated entities.  The stock price of CMLS popped 39% at the announcement.

Company Portfolio

Radio 

Bay Shore, New York
 WBZO (103.1 Max FM)

Bridgeport, Connecticut
 WEZN-FM (Star 99.9)
 WICC (WICC 600 AM and 107.3 FM)

Frederick, Maryland
 WFMD (Free Talk 930 WFMD)
 WFRE (Free Country 99.9 WFRE)

Hempstead, New York
 WHLI (1100 WHLI)
 WKJY (K98.3)

New Haven, Connecticut
 WPLR (99.1 PLR)
 WYBC-FM (94.3 WYBC)
Patchogue, New York
 WALK-FM (WALK 97.5)

Smithtown, New York
 WWSK (The Shark 94.3)

Southport, Connecticut
 WFOX (95.9 The Fox)

Westport, Connecticut
 WEBE (WEBE108)

References

External links
 https://connoisseurmedia.com/

Radio broadcasting companies of the United States
Companies based in Westport, Connecticut
Connoisseur Media radio stations